Silvio Rojas (born 3 November 1959) is a Bolivian footballer. He played in 24 matches for the Bolivia national football team from 1979 to 1987. He was also part of Bolivia's squad for the 1983 Copa América tournament.

References

External links
 

1959 births
Living people
Association football forwards
Bolivian footballers
Bolivia international footballers
Independiente Petrolero managers
People from Andrés Ibáñez Province